Hamish Mackie (born October 1973) is a British wildlife sculptor who works in bronze, silver and any other castable metal using the lost-wax casting method. He is considered to be one of the world's foremost wildlife sculptors. Largely self-taught, Mackie captures his subjects - ranging from livestock to birds via wild animals - by observation in a natural environment, taking detailed photographs and sometimes modelling in plasticine. From this he creates a highly accurate anatomical core covered with a loose, almost impressionistic skin that captures the essence of the animal's personality. He has won numerous commissions including works for Jilly Cooper, Charles Saatchi, Ronnie Wood (private) and RSPCA, National Trust, Woburn Abbey, Merrill Lynch, Hiscox and most recently the Berkeley Group Holdings (public). He has travelled to places including Antarctica, the Falkland Islands, Australia, across Africa, and the United Arab Emirates in search of subjects.

Biography

Early life
Hamish Mackie was born in Reading, England in 1973. His father was in the British Army, so the family spent the first years of Mackie's life living in both Hong Kong and the UK, before settling permanently on a farm in Lostwithiel, Cornwall in 1978. From an early age Mackie was tasked with many farm duties, including looking after livestock.

Education
After prep school Mackie went to Radley College, where he found the support of its Art Department. Paul Kilsby, his sculpture teacher, acknowledged Mackie's strength in capturing the dynamic animal form. Mackie made his first sale during his A-level show: two clay lambs for £50 to a family friend.

The buyer took the lambs to Simon Allison at the Lockbund Sculpture Foundry to be cast in bronze, introducing him to one of the most important working relationships of his career. 'Simon called me up and asked me if I wanted to sign them. I drove up to meet him and see their lost-wax casting process.' This began a working relationship that has lasted to this day.

In 1992 Mackie did a foundation course at Falmouth University followed by, in 1993, a BA in Product and Furniture Design at Kingston University. He paid his way by selling his sculptures, for example Tregothnan Estates commissioned Mackie to do a buzzard, followed by an otter for Trewithen Estates.

After university, Mackie travelled extensively in Africa, and in 1995 he took a job in a hunting camp in Zimbabwe. He observed how environment impacts character, particularly the distinction between a wild animal and one in captivity. His interest led him to the conservationist Ian Craig in Kenya, backed by TUSK, an organisation he still supports. Face to face with African wildlife, the urge to sculpt overcame him and he created a cheetah head out of beeswax and paraffin.

Career
Mackie returned to the UK determined to sculpt full-time. He met with the renowned wildlife sculptor Mark Coreth, carrying his wax cheetah head under his arm.  From there Mackie met with Simon Allison again to explore the prospect of casting his models in bronze for commercial sale. Allison was confident enough in Mackie's skills to defer payment until he started to sell. In 1996 Mackie moved closer to the foundry in Oxfordshire, and entered into the Art for Youth competition where he won the "Diana Brooks Prize". The following year

He was accepted into the Royal Academy's "Summer Exhibition", following on from his first solo show with Fanshawe Somerset, London. Several successful solo shows followed, and in 2010 his solo show, also at the Cork Street Gallery, outperformed most of the galleries at Frieze Art Fair that year.

In 2013 Mackie landed his most important public commission to date: six life and a quarter-size horses designed to look as though they are galloping through the Berkeley Group Holdings development in Goodman's Fields, in the Spitalfields district of the London Borough of Tower Hamlets, in east London. The sculptures were revealed at the end of June 2015 and in 2016, Mackie was awarded the Public Monuments and Sculpture Association's (PMSA) annual Marsh Award for Excellence in Public Sculpture and Public Fountains.

Mackie's work was exhibited at the opening of the Clarendon Fine Art gallery in Hampstead, London alongside work from prominent contemporary artists, Todd White, Sherree Valentine-Daines and Christian Hook.

Artistic style

Mackie's sculptures are distinctive for a highly accurate anatomical core covered by a loose, almost impressionistic skin. He is capable of turning his hand to almost any creature, as his extensive range of work reveals.

This loose style allows him to highlight the differences in, for instance muscle groups, hair texture and even capture character via a careful working of eyes, nose and other defining features. His sculpting style is underpinned by a striking sympathy with animal kind.

He has stated, "Having spent so much time studying wildlife in its natural environment, I've developed a true understanding of animal behaviour". Indeed, when in the field in places like Africa and Antarctica, as well as his camera, he will also take plasticine with him.

Exhibitions

Past Exhibitions
 1996 Art for Youth – winner of the Diana Brookes Prize 
 1996 First Solo show, Air Gallery, Fanshawe Somerset, London
 1997 Royal Academy Summer Exhibition, London
 1998 Brewin Dolphin, CLA Game Fair
 1999 Cotswold Wildlife Park in Aid of Tusk Trust, Oxfordshire
 2000 Hiscox Insurance, London
 2001 Art London
 2002 Soane, London
 2003 Rathbones, Edinburgh
 2004 Second Solo Show, The Gallery, Cork Street
 2005 Knight Frank, Inhomes, Hungerford
 2006 Third Solo Show, Fine Art Commission, London
 2008 Represented by Collier and Dobson
 2010 Mallett, American International Fine Art Fair, The Palm Beach Jewellery, Art and Antique show, Florida
 2010 and every year since, RHS Chelsea Flower Show, London 
 2012 Fourth Solo Show, Mallett, New York
 2012 Olympics Public Art (Sculpture 2012), Grosvenor Square and Oxford Street, London
 2013 and every year since, Mallett, the San Francisco Fall Antiques Fair
 2013 Game and Wildlife Conservation Trust, Highgrove, Gloucestershire
 2013 Fifth Solo Show, The Gallery, Cork Street
 2016 Sixth Solo Show, 'Life in Bronze', Mall Galleries, London 
 2017 Muse Sculpture, Royal Ascot, Berkshire & Olympia, London
 2017 Blenheim Palace, Oxfordshire, Mackie's Andalusian Stallion on public display
 2017 Stowe School, Buckinghamshire, Mackie's Andalusian Stallion on public display
 2017 Blenheim Horse Trials, Blenheim Palace, Oxfordshire, Mackie's Andalusian Stallion on public display
 2017 Sculpt at Kew, Royal Botanic Gardens, Kew, London

Selected Commissions 

 Merrill Lynch, London			
 Hiscox, London				
 Andrew Winch Design			
 Countryside Alliance			
 Lewa Downs, Kenya				
 Chippenham Park, Cambridgeshire	
 Knowsley Park, Derbyshire			
 Tregothnan Estates, Cornwall		
 Trewithen Estates, Cornwall		
 Cadogan Estates						
 Gilbane Development Company, Rhode Island
 Bahamas Development Company, Bahamas
 Alibaba Group, Hong Kong							
 Purdey, London (Resident Sculptor) 	
 Clear Water, Nova Scotia, Canada
 Radley College
 National Trust
 Barclays Private Bank Ltd
 The Himalayan Garden, Yorkshire
 Floors Castle
 Chapman University, California
 Westminster Estates
 Woburn Abbey
 Sogo Hong Kong
 British Racing School

Major Public Commission:
Six bronze horses, life and a quarter size, for Berkeley Homes' Goodman’s Fields development in London.

Family

Mackie is married with three daughters.

References

1973 births
Living people
Alumni of Falmouth University
Alumni of Kingston University
Artists from Reading, Berkshire
English male sculptors